Taimur Hussain (born 2 February 1974) is a Pakistani professional golfer. In 1998 he became the first Pakistani to win on the Asian Tour when he captured the Myanmar Open.

Amateur wins
1995 Nomura Cup

Professional wins (3)

Asian Tour wins (1)

Asian Tour playoff record (0–1)

Other wins (2)
1995 Pakistan Open (as an amateur)
2001 Pakistan Open

References

External links 
Myanmar Open win

Pakistani male golfers
Japan Golf Tour golfers
Asian Tour golfers
Punjabi people
Pakistani expatriates in Japan
Sportspeople from Lahore
1974 births
Living people